Bangladesh Society of Microbiologists (BSM) is an association of Bangladeshi Microbiologists.

History
The Bangladesh Society of Microbiologists was established in 1976 by a few researchers and intellectuals from Bangladesh.  From the period of its establishment, it has emerged as the largest association of intellectuals and researchers in Bangladesh. The founder president of the society was Major General M. R. Choudhury (Mahmudur Rahman Choudhury) who died on June 24, 1999.

Founders
Professor Aminul Islam,
Major General M.R. Chowdhury,
Dr. K.M.S. Aziz,
Dr. Imdadul Huq,
Dr. Farida Huq,
Professor Naiyyum Choudhury
 Professor Khairul Bashar,
 Professor M.R. Khan,
 Major General Matiur Rahman,
 Mr. G.K. Joardar,
 Professor S.S. Qadri,
 Professor Mamun Rashid Chowdhury,
 Dr. Mohosin Patwary,
 Dr. Fazle Rabbi,
 Dr. Ansar Ali,
 Dr. Shahjahan Kabir,
 Dr. Syeda Quadsia Akhter (late),
 Dr. Syed Ashraf Ahmed,
 Dr. Firdausi Qadri,
 Dr. Mohammed Rahmatullah,
 Dr. M. Showkat Ali,
 Dr. M.A. Rahim and others.

Web site
 Bangladesh Society of Microbiologist

Microbiology organizations
Science and technology in Bangladesh
Medical and health organisations based in Bangladesh
Learned societies of Bangladesh